Forssa Airfield  is an airfield in Forssa, Finland, about  southeast of Forssa town centre.

See also
List of airports in Finland

References

External links
 VFR Suomi/Finland – Forssa Airfield
 Lentopaikat.net – Forssa Airfield 

Airports in Finland
Airfield
Buildings and structures in Kanta-Häme